Club Deportivo Luis Angel Firpo is a Salvadoran professional association football club based in Usutlan. The club was formed in 1908 as Tecún Umán. Firpo currently plays in the Primera División.

This list encompasses the major honours won by Firpo and records set by the club, their managers and their players. The player records section includes details of the club's leading goalscorers and those who have made most appearances in first-team competitions. It also records notable achievements by Firpo players on the international stage, and the highest transfer fees paid and received by the club.

Firpo has set various records since its founding.

Honours 
Firpo has won primera division ten times, which ranks tied for fourth in Salvadoran football history.

Domestic honours

League
 Primera División and predecessors 
 Champions (10): 1988–89, 1990–91, 1991–92, 1992–93, 1997–98, 1999 Clausura, 2000 Clausura, Apertura 2007, Clausura 2008, Clausura 2013
 Segunda División Salvadorean and predecessors 
 Champions: TBD
 Tercera División Salvadorean and predecessors 
 Champions: TBD

Cups
 Copa President and predecessors 
 Runners-up (1) : 2000

CONCACAF
 CONCACAF Cup Winners Cup 
 Runners up (1) : 1995

Individual Honours

Team statistics

Primera Division 
 Most seasons played in Primera Division: 32 years (from 1982 season to Clausura 2014) 
 Most consecutive games undefeated: 31 games, 13 wins and 18 draws, (1990/91 seasons)
 Most consecutive wins: 17 (in TBD season)
 Most consecutive lost: 17 (in TBD season)

Matches

Firsts 
First league match: TBD 3–2 Firpo, Prima Categoria, 10 January 1909.
First Copa Presidente match: Firpo 14–0 TBD, 11 November 1926.
First CONCACAF match: Firpo 0–1 C.S. Cartaginés, CONCACAF Champions League, 1989.

Wins 
Record win: 16–0 against TBD, Prima Categoria, 10 January 1915.
Record Primera division win: 11–0 against Cojutepeque F.C., 30 April 1995. 
Record Copa El Salvador win: 5–0 against Maracaná San Rafael, 2006.
Record win in CONCACAF competitions: 8–0 against CRKSV Jong Colombia, CONCACAF Cup Winners Cup, 1995.
Most wins in a Primera division season: 30 (out of 38 games), during the 2006–07 season.

Defeats 
Record Primera division defeat: 1–9 against TBD, 10 June 1961.
Record Copa El Salvador defeat:
 0–5 against TBD, 8 January 1998;
Record defeat in CONCACAF competitions:
 0-4 against Pérez Zeledón, CONCACAF Champions League, 2005.
Most defeats in a Primera division season: 19 (out of 40 games), during the TBD season.
Fewest defeats in a Primera division season: 1 (out of 38 games), during the TBD season.

Points 
Most points in a Primera division season:
League format: TBD in 38 games, during the TBD season
Apertura/Clausura formats: TBD in 38 games, during the TBD season.
Fewest points in a Primera season:
League format: TBD in 30 games, during the TBD season.
Apertura/Clausura formats: TBD in 38 games, during the TBD season.

Overall 
 Most consecutive games undefeated: 41 games (from 20 August, 1990 to 10 April, 1991)

International representation
At the beginning of the nineties they participated in their first international tournament, and surpassed expectations by defeating the Mexican side Pumas UNAM 1–0 in the first round however they lost in the second round by penalties against Alajuelense from Costa Rica. For the 2008–09 CONCACAF Champions League, they were eliminated in the group stage, after having qualified directly into the round as El Salvador's champions. They once again participated in the 2009–10 CONCACAF Champions League, however they were eliminated in the preliminary round by the MLS team DC United.

Performance in CONCACAF competitions

CONCACAF Champions' Cup: 8 appearances
Best: Quarter-finals in 1997 and 1998
1989 : First Round
1990 : Third Round
1991 : Third Round
1992 : Third Round
1993 : Second Round
1994 : First Round
1997 : Quarter-finals
1998 : Quarter-finals

CONCACAF Champions League: 3 appearances
Best: Group stage in 2008 and 2013
2008–09 : Group stage
2009–10 : Preliminary round
2013–14 : Group stage

<div style="text-align:left">

CONCACAF Cup Winners Cup: 2 appearances
Best: Runner up in 1995
1993 : 3rd place
1995 : Runner-up

Copa Interclubes UNCAF: 2 appearances
Best: Quarter-finals in 2005
 1999 : First Round
 2005 : Quarter-finals

Record versus other clubs
 As of 2013-09-13
The Concacaf opponents below = Official tournament results:
(Plus a sampling of other results)

Historical Matches

Players statistics 

|-

Firpo's top flight top goalscorer
This is the list of Firpo's top league goalscorers in a single season

By competition
Most goals scored in all competitions: TBD –  TBD, Year–Yesr
Most goals scored in Primera Division: TBD –  TBD, Year–Yesr
Most goals scored in Copa Presidente: TBD –  TBD, Year–Yesr
Most goals scored in International competitions: TBD''  –  TBD, Year–Yesr
Most goals scored in CONCACAF competitions: TBD –  TBD, Year–Yesr
Most goals scored in UNCAF competitions: TBD –  TBD, Year–Yesr
Most goals scored in CONCACAF Champions League: TBD –  TBD, Year–Yesr
Most goals scored in UNCAF Cup: TBD –  TBD, Year–Yesr
Most goals scored in FIFA World Cup: 1 –  TBD, 1982

In a single season
Most goals scored in a season in all competitions: TBD –  TBD, Year–Year
Most goals scored in a single Primera Division season: TBD –  TBD, Year–Year
Most goals scored in a single Apertura/Clausura season: TBD –  TBD, Year–Year
Most goals scored in a single Copa Presidente season: TBD –  TBD, Year–Year
Most goals scored in a single CONCACAF Champions League season: TBD –  TBD, Year–Year
Most goals scored in a single UNCAF Cup season: 5 –  Celio Rodriguez, 1999

In a single match
Most goals scored in a League match: 7 Mario Águila Zelaya v Olimpic, 24 December 1950
Most goals scored in a Copa Presidente match: TBD TBD v TBD, Day Month Year
Most goals scored in an Apertura/Clausura match: TBD TBD v TBD, Day Month Year
Most goals scored in a CONCACAF Champions League match: 3 Fernando Da Moura v Acros Duurly, 21 April 1991
Most goals scored in a UNCAF Cup match: 2 Manuel Martínez v Comunicaciones, 28 July 2005   Manuel Martínez v Comunicaciones, 2 August 2005   Celio Rodríguez v Saprissa, 17 February 1999

Others
Youngest goalscorer:  –  TBD v TBD, Year Primera Division, Day Month Year
 Oldest goalscorer: –   TBD v TBD, Year Primera Division, Day Month Year
Most goals scored in CONCACAF Finals: TBD TBD, four in TBD.
Fastest goal:12 seconds –  TBD v TND, Primera Division, Day Month Year
 Fastest hat-trick: 8 minutes –  TBD v TBD, Year Primera Division, Day Month Year
 Most hat-tricks in Primera Division: TBD –  TBD, Year-Year
 Most hat-tricks in a single season: TBD –  TBD,2011–12 (7 times in league).
 Most titles won by player with Luis Angel Firpo: Leonel Carcamo (7 titles)'''

Miscellaneous
The highest transfer fee received by the club for a player was $100,000, paid by Club America for Toninho Do Santos in 1991.
The highest transfer fee paid by the club for a player was TBD, paid to TBD for TBD on TBD.
 Luis Antonio Regalado was the inaugural Firpo player to be called to the El Salvador national football team
 Firpo one of four side to win three consecutive titles 1990-1993

Notable players

World Cup  players

The following World Cup  players, played at Firpo at some point during their career. Highlighted players played for Firpo while playing at the World Cup.

  José Francisco Jovel (Spain 1982)
  Miguel Ángel Díaz (Spain 1982)
  Tomás Pineda (Mexico 1970)

National team Players 
The following National football team  players, played at Firpo at some point during their career. Highlighted players played for Firpo while playing at the World Cup.

  David Diach
  Erick Scott
  Óscar Mejía
  Bobby White
  Pompilio Cacho
  Jeremie Lynch
  Cyril Errington
  Nicolás Muñoz
  Percival Piggott
  Víctor Herrera Piggott
  Armando Polo
  Frank Palomino
  Miguel Seminario 
  Ricardo John
  Jomal Williams
  Washington Olivera
  Daniel de Oliveira

External links
 http://www.elsalvador.com/deportes/futbol/274224/firpo-la-caida-de-un-grande/

References

Notes

C.D. Luis Ángel Firpo
Salvadoran football club records and statistics